Bachia beebei is a species of lizard in the family Gymnophthalmidae. It is endemic to Venezuela.

References

Bachia
Reptiles described in 2019
Reptiles of Venezuela
Endemic fauna of Venezuela
Taxa named by John C. Murphy
Taxa named by Daniele Salvi
Taxa named by Joana L. Santos
Taxa named by Alvin L. Braswell
Taxa named by Stevland P. Charles
Taxa named by Amaél Borzée
Taxa named by Michael J. Jowers